Vugar Mustafayev (born on 5 August 1994) is an Azerbaijani professional footballer who plays as a midfielder for Azerbaijan Premier League side Sumgayit.

Career

Club
On 3 June 2019, Mustafayev signed a one-year contract with Sumgayit FK.

International
On 26 May 2016 Mustafayev made his senior international debut for Azerbaijan friendly match against Andorra.

Career statistics

Club

International

Statistics accurate as of match played 26 May 2016

Honours

International
Azerbaijan U23
 Islamic Solidarity Games: (1) 2017

References

External links
 

1994 births
Living people
Association football midfielders
Azerbaijani footballers
FC Baku players
Simurq PIK players
Qarabağ FK players
Zira FK players
Sumgayit FK players
Azerbaijan Premier League players
Azerbaijan under-21 international footballers
Azerbaijan youth international footballers
Azerbaijan international footballers